Muna Jabir Adam (born 6 January 1987) is a Sudanese athlete born in Al-Ubayyid who specializes in the 400 metres hurdles.

Achievements

Personal bests
200 metres - 23.88 s (2007) - national record.
400 metres - 53.34 s (2004)
800 metres - 2:02.43 min s (2005) - national record.
100 metres hurdles - 14.31 s (2007) - national record.
400 metres hurdles - 54.93 s (2007) - national record.
Heptathlon - 4977 pts (2005) - national record.

References
 

1987 births
Living people
People from North Kurdufan
Sudanese female hurdlers
Olympic athletes of Sudan
Athletes (track and field) at the 2008 Summer Olympics
World Athletics Championships athletes for Sudan
African Games gold medalists for Sudan
African Games medalists in athletics (track and field)
African Games bronze medalists for Sudan
Athletes (track and field) at the 2003 All-Africa Games
Athletes (track and field) at the 2007 All-Africa Games